Project Galileo is an educational astronomy project, based at Clifton College in Bristol, in the United Kingdom.

History
Project Galileo started in December 2000, as a result of a telescope being donated to a Bristol school, with the overall aim of making the system available for other schools in the area to use. The system became operational in July 2005, and achieved full on-line capability by the autumn of 2008, running until the main project co-ordinator left teaching.

Aims
Project Galileo aims to provide a curriculum resource for Science and Technology at Key Stages 3 & 4 and AS/A2 levels, including ICT & Design & Technology courses at post-16 level,  to inspire teenagers to "learn the art as well as science of research and research teams, how scientific research is practiced, how physical ideas become mainstream, how collaboration between scientific disciplines fosters greater understanding, and to encourage links and collaboration between schools of different age-ranges and traditions in the city of Bristol." (Project FAQ)

The project focuses on the issues surrounding the maintenance and successful operation of a remote-controlled observatory.  It is built around a remote-controlled telescope with a 1.3 metre dome and CCD camera located in Bristol, which enables imaging and searches of comets, asteroids, supernovae, deep-sky and planetary objects.

How it works
Schools registered via the main Project Galileo website, and then logged in to the telescope to order images, much in the same way as is done with other online school observatories. One important feature of the software being developed for the project is that it comes under the GPL, so other schools or institutions who want to develop similar systems will be able to modify the code rather than having to spend vital educational budgets for proprietary software.  The code being used for the project can be found via the #External links.

Other institutions using similar code are the DRACO project at Durham University and R.O.Y. (the Robotic Observatory at York), based at York University.  Project Galileo uses code developed by  Dr John Lucey at Durham University, and ROY is in the process of migrating from Windows-based software to code used by Project Galileo.  All the code being developed is the work of volunteer efforts - if you wish to contribute, please  visit the external links section below for more details.

Here is a simplified diagram of how the system works:

In reality, the backend database and control software consist of several systems, including an image processing cluster which is responsible for creating the final processed versions of the raw images that are taken by the telescope.

Results so far

A larger selection of images taken with the observatory are available in the image gallery.

References

Physics Education (January2003) (Institute of Physics, UK. ) 
Models, Kits, and Astronomy Projects ] (Particle Physics and Astronomy Research Council, UK. )

Other online observatories
These are online observatories dedicated for UK school use - more international observatories will be also listed here in time. All the systems below currently give free access to UK educational institutions
Faulkes Telescope Project
Bradford Robotic Telescope
The Schools Observatory

External links
Project Galileo
Clifton College Project Galileo page
Sourceforge software developer's page for Project Galileo

Astronomy education
Science and technology in the United Kingdom
Education in the United Kingdom